The Ven.  James Jones, DD (1730-1823) was  Archdeacon of Hereford from 1787 until his death.

He was educated at New College, Oxford. Later he was the incumbent at Shinfield and then of  St Mary Somerset. He died on 29 January 1823:

Notes

1730 births
1823 deaths
Alumni of New College, Oxford
Archdeacons of Hereford